Nawaf bin Dhahi bin Faisal Al-Suwaiti Al-Aqidi (born 10 May 2000) is a Saudi professional footballer who plays as a goalkeeper for Al-Nassr.

Career

Club
Nawaf began his career for the youth team of Al-Nassr. On 30 June 2019, he was chosen in the Saudi program to develop football talents established by General Sports Authority. He signed his first professional contract with Al-Nassr on 8 August 2019. He returned from the program due to family circumstances and was promoted to Al-Nassr's first-team on 31 December 2019. On 11 January 2020, he was named on the bench for the first team the league match against Al-Ittihad. On 30 September 2021, Al-Aqidi made his debut for Al-Nassr in the league match against Abha. On 30 January 2022, Al-Aqidi joined Al-Tai on loan. He made his debut on 12 February 2022, in the 3–1 win against Al-Batin. He made 7 appearances and kept 3 clean sheets for Al-Tai before returning to Al-Nassr at the end of the season.

International

Saudi Arabia U23
He played for the Saudi Arabia U20 national team but was not part of the 2020 AFC U-19 Championship qualification, in which Saudi Arabia qualified with two wins and one draw. However, with the 2020 AFC U-19 Championship cancelled due to COVID-19 pandemic, he was able to redeem himself in the 2022 AFC U-23 Asian Cup with a spectacular performance, guiding the team to conquer the first title without conceding a single goal and a near perfect record with only Japan managed to hold Saudi Arabia a draw.

He was also summoned for the Islamic Solidarity Games in Konya, Turkey, which was delayed to 2022 due to the same reason. Al-Aqidi once again impressed in the tournament without conceding a single goal in the group stage until the semi-finals, when he finally conceded a goal after eight consecutive clean sheets, in Saudi Arabia's 2–1 win over Algeria, albeit it was from a penalty rather than an open play. In the final, Al-Aqidi finally conceded the first ever open play goal after nine games, which was against the hosts Turkey in a pressuring attempt that saw Metehan Altunbaş netted, yet that goal proved disastrous as Saudi Arabia proved unable to break the Turkish defence as Saudi Arabia's hope to win the second major tournament in the same year crashed by this 0–1 loss.

Senior
On 18 November 2021, Al-Aqidi called up to the senior side for the first time to take part in the 2021 FIFA Arab Cup. He made no appearances in the competition, as Saudi Arabia exited at the group stage.

On 11 November 2022, Al-Aqidi was named in the squad for the 2022 FIFA World Cup. He didn't play a single game in the tournament as third choice keeper to Mohammed Al-Owais and Mohammed Al-Rubaie, as Saudi Arabia again crashed out of the group stage despite historic win over Argentina in the opener.

On 30 December 2022, Al-Aqidi was named in the squad for the 25th Arabian Gulf Cup. He started in all three matches, as Saudi Arabia again failed to progress from the group stage.

Honours
Al-Nassr
Saudi Super Cup: 2020

Saudi Arabia U23
AFC U-23 Asian Cup: 2022

Individual
 Saudi Professional League Young Player of the Month: May & June 2022
 AFC U-23 Asian Cup Best Goalkeeper: 2022

References

External links

2000 births
Living people
Sportspeople from Riyadh
Association football goalkeepers
Saudi Arabian footballers
Saudi Arabia youth international footballers
Saudi Arabia international footballers
Al Nassr FC players
Al-Tai FC players
Saudi Professional League players
2022 FIFA World Cup players